The Croatian community of Australia has played an important part in the history of Australian soccer. Countless clubs have been formed over the years in every state and territory, except for the Northern Territory. At present there are 34 active Croatian soccer clubs operating in Australia. 

The first Croatian soccer/sporting club founded in Australia was HSNK Zora (no longer in existence), which was founded in 1931. Currently the oldest surviving Croatian club in Australia is the Adelaide Raiders, founded in 1952 as Adelaide Croatia. The most successful and largest Croatian clubs in Australia are the Melbourne Knights and Sydney United, both clubs played in the National Soccer League for 21 seasons. 

The Croatian community holds the Australian-Croatian Soccer Tournament which has been held annually since 1974. It is the largest 'ethnic' based soccer cup competition in Australia as well as the oldest national soccer competition in Australia, with clubs from all over the country and even New Zealand competing.

Clubs by state (top flight clubs in italics) 

Australian Capital Territory
Canberra Croatia FC
HNK O'Connor Knights

New South Wales
Sydney United 58
South Coast United
Hurstville ZFC
Newcastle Croatia
Werrington Croatia FC
HNK Edensor Park
NK Kralj Tomislav
HNK Dalmacija Sydney

Queensland
Gold Coast Knights
Brisbane Knights FC
Sunnyside Croatia
NK Adriatic Gold Coast
Stratford Dolphins FC

South Australia
Adelaide Croatia Radiders
Whyalla Croatia

Tasmania
Glenorchy Knights

Victoria
Melbourne Knights
St Albans Saints
North Geelong Warriors
Dandenong City
FC Strathmore Split
St Albans Vukovar
Gospic Bears
NK Bunker
Wednesday Knights FC
Irymple Knights
HNK Mostar Melbourne 1980
Melbourne Tornado Zadar

Western Australia
Western Knights
Gwelup Croatia

See also

List of sports clubs inspired by others
List of Greek Soccer clubs in Australia
List of Italian Soccer clubs in Australia
List of Serbian soccer clubs in Australia

References

Croatian-Australian culture
Croatia
Australia

 
Croatian
Croatian Soccer clubs